NGC 220 is an open cluster located approximately 210,000 light-years from the Sun in the Small Magellanic Cloud. It is located in the constellation Tucana. It was discovered on August 12, 1834 by John Herschel.

See also 
 open cluster 
 List of NGC objects (1–1000)
 Small Magellanic Cloud

References

External links 
 
 SEDS

0220
Open clusters
Tucana (constellation)
Small Magellanic Cloud
Astronomical objects discovered in 1834